Nicolai Vollquartz (born 7 February 1965) is a Danish football referee. He was born in Viborg. He was promoted to the FIFA referees list in 1999 and took charge of his first UEFA Cup match – a first round tie between Rapid București and Liverpool – on 14 September 2000. His UEFA Champions League debut came a year later, with a second qualifying round match between Wisła Kraków and Skonto. It was another five years before he officiated a Champions League group stage match – the Group B match between Sporting CP and Spartak Moscow on 5 December 2006 – but it was to be his only experience in the group stage.

External links
Profile at WorldReferee.com

1965 births
Living people
People from Viborg Municipality
Danish football referees
Sportspeople from the Central Denmark Region